Witan Investment Trust plc is a multi-managed, global equity investment trust. It is listed on the London Stock Exchange and is a constituent of the FTSE 250 Index.

History
Witan Investment Trust plc (Witan) was established in 1909 to manage the estate of Alexander Henderson, 1st Baron Faringdon. First listed on the London Stock Exchange in 1924, it established Henderson Administration (now Henderson Global Investors) to manage its funds in 1932 and then sold its remaining stake in Henderson in 1997. In 2004, Witan became self-managed, appointed its first CEO and adopted a multi-manager approach. Andrew Bell was appointed CEO in 2010. In 2020, Witan became a signatory to the UN-supported Principles for Responsible Investment.

Operations
The company's portfolio is actively managed between a selection of 8 to 12 third-party delegated investment managers. They manage approximately 90% of Witan’s assets. The remaining assets are invested directly by Witan’s Executive team, which is also responsible for the selection and monitoring of the managers and for the management of the Company’s gearing, under delegated guidelines from the Board.

The CEO of Witan Investment Trust plc is Andrew Bell. The chairman of Witan Investment Trust plc is Andrew Ross.

References

External links
 

Investment trusts of the United Kingdom
Companies listed on the London Stock Exchange